Maud Evelyn Petty-Fitzmaurice, Marchioness of Lansdowne  (née Hamilton; 17 December 1850 – 21 October 1932), was a British courtier. She served as vice-regal consort while her husband Henry Charles Keith Petty-FitzMaurice, 5th Marquess of Lansdowne was Governor General of Canada from 1883 to 1888. She was then Vicereine of India from 1888 to 1894 while her husband was Viceroy.

Marriage
Lady Lansdowne was a daughter of James Hamilton, 1st Duke of Abercorn, and Lady Louisa Jane Russell. On 8 November 1869, she married Henry Petty-Fitzmaurice, 5th Marquess of Lansdowne, at Westminster Abbey and they had four children:

 Lady Evelyn Emily Mary Fitzmaurice (27 August 1870 – 2 April 1960)
 Henry William Edmund Petty-Fitzmaurice, Earl of Kerry (14 January 1872 – 5 March 1936)
 Lord Charles George Francis Fitzmaurice (12 February 1874 – 30 October 1914)
 Lady Beatrix Frances Fitzmaurice (25 March 1877 – 5 August 1953)

Later years
From 1905 to 1909 she was a Lady of the Bedchamber to Queen Alexandra; she was Extra Lady from 1910 to 1925. During the First World War she set up the Officers' Families Fund and served as its president, and she and her husband lent their house, Lansdowne House in Berkeley Square, London, to serve as its headquarters. She had previously done the same in the Second Boer War. She also set up an auxiliary Red Cross hospital in the Orangery at Bowood House on their Wiltshire estate.

For this and other charitable services, she was appointed Dame Grand Cross of the Order of the British Empire (GBE) in the 1920 civilian war honours.

Death
She died in 1932, aged 81, and was buried (as her husband had been, five years earlier) at Derry Hill church, at the gates of their Bowood estate.

Ancestry

References

Obituary, The Times, 22 October 1932.

1850 births
1932 deaths
Place of birth missing
Place of death missing
British marchionesses
Members of the Order of the Companions of Honour
Companions of the Order of the Crown of India
Dames Grand Cross of the Order of the British Empire
Dames Grand Cross of the Order of St John
Ladies of the Royal Order of Victoria and Albert
Canadian viceregal consorts
Daughters of British dukes
Ladies of the Bedchamber
Maud
British women in World War I
Viceregal consorts of India
Wives of knights